Andrea Tecchio (born 2 February 1987 in Arzignano, Italy) is an Italian footballer.

Capecchi started his career with L.R. Vicenza Virtus in 2006, where he has made two appearances in Serie B.

Notes

External links

1987 births
Living people
Italian footballers
Association football defenders
L.R. Vicenza players
Rovigo Calcio players